Serjeant Charles Victor Robinson  (24 May 1897 – 28 July 1961) was a British World War I flying ace credited with seven aerial victories. He flew on at least 100 bombing missions as an observer.

Awards and citations
Distinguished Flying Medal
No. 207177 Serjeant Charles Victor Robinson, late 205th Squadron, Royal Air Force.
"On 18 May 1918, whilst acting as observer in a bombing attack on Chaulnes Railway Junction, his formation was attacked by seven enemy scouts. His machine was attacked simultaneously by two of these, one of which he shot down in flames. On the previous day he dropped a  bomb on this junction, causing a great conflagration. Serjeant Robinson has carried out 100 successful bombing raids, and is a most reliable Observer."

References

1897 births
1961 deaths
Royal Air Force personnel
Royal Naval Air Service personnel of World War I
Royal Air Force personnel of World War I
Recipients of the Distinguished Flying Medal
British World War I flying aces
People from Marylebone
Military personnel from London